Morăreni may refer to several villages in Romania:

 Morăreni, a village in Lupeni Commune, Harghita County
 Morăreni, a village in Rușii-Munți Commune, Mureș County
 Morăreni, a village in Alexandru Vlahuţă Commune, Vaslui County